Dumb Dicks (1932) is an American Pre-Code comedy film directed by Ralph Ceder and starring Benny Rubin.

Plot summary
Two incompetent private detectives pose as swamis in order to infiltrate a gang of bank robbers.

Cast
Tim Seals
Benny Rubin as Detective Rubin
Heinie Conklin
Billy Franey
Harry Gribbon

References

External links

1932 films
1932 comedy films
RKO Pictures short films
American black-and-white films
American comedy short films
1932 short films
1930s English-language films
1930s American films